Otokomi Lake is located in Glacier National Park, in the U. S. state of Montana. Otokomi Lake is in a cirque north of Goat Mountain. The lake is a   hike by trail from the Rising Sun Auto Camp.

See also
List of lakes in Glacier County, Montana

References

Lakes of Glacier National Park (U.S.)
Lakes of Glacier County, Montana